Jessica E. Miranda is an American politician and businesswoman who is the member of the Ohio House of Representatives from the 28th district in Hamilton County. The district consists of Madeira, Forest Park, Blue Ash, Sycamore, Sharonville, Evendale, Reading, and Montgomery. Miranda represents over 116,000 residents 

Miranda served as President of the Winton Woods City School District and she served on the Economic Development Commission for the City of Forest Park. She is a board member of the Forest Park Chamber of Commerce.

Early life and career
Miranda attended Talawanda High School near Oxford, Ohio. Miranda and her husband, Jose, are parents of three daughters,

Ohio House of Representatives
In the 2018 election, Miranda defeated incumbent Representative Jonathan Dever to win her seat in Ohio House of Representatives. In 2016, Miranda lost her challenge to Dever 42.62% to 57.38%. On election night in 2018, Dever initially appeared to lead. However, after the bipartisan Hamilton County Board of Elections counted provisional ballots as part of a closely watched recount, Miranda was declared the victor by a 56-vote margin. This was the closest margin of victory of any state legislative campaign in Ohio.

Miranda serves as ranking member of the Insurance committee as well as on the Rules & Reference, Transportation & Public Safety, Ohio Commission of Hispanic & Latino Affairs, and Ohio Aviation & Aerospace Committees.

In her second term, Miranda was elected Minority Whip for Ohio House Democratic Caucus. Miranda is also a member of the Ohio Business First Caucus and the Ohio Gun Violence Prevention Caucus, which she co-founded with Ohio Senator Cecil Thomas.

Winton Woods Board of Education
Miranda was elected to the Winton Woods Board of Education in 2013 and served until 2018, during which time she was Vice President, President, Legislative Liaison, and Bond Levy Chairperson. She received a Community Spirit Award for her "years of service" and "significant contributions" to the Winton Woods City School District.

Election history

References

Miranda, Jessica
Living people
21st-century American politicians
21st-century American women politicians
Women state legislators in Ohio
Year of birth missing (living people)